The 16th Legislative Assembly of Costa Rica since the current 1949 Constitution met from 1 May 2014 till 30 April 2018 in the Cuesta de Moras' Building in San José.

Members 

Deputies